Cristina Torrens Valero was the defending champion, but lost in first round to Joanna Sakowicz.

Dinara Safina won the title against Henrieta Nagyová. Safina was leading 6–3, 4–0 when Nagyová was forced to retire.

Seeds
The first two seeds received a bye into the second round.

Draw

Finals

Top half

Bottom half

References
 Main and Qualifying Draws

Women's Singles
2002 WTA Tour